Liu Jiao (Chinese:劉交, died April 179 BC) was a younger brother of Emperor Gaozu of Han and a famous scholar.

Biography
In early life, he studied at the Qin capital as a scholar, and left after the Burning of books and burying of scholars event. After Han Xin lost his title in 201 BC, Emperor Gaozu divided the existing Chu territory into Chu and Jing. Among the four brothers of Emperor Gaozu, Jiao was most trusted, he was made Prince Yuan of Chu, while a clan member Liu Jia was made Prince of Jing.  In April 179 BC, Jiao died and his second son, Liu Yingke inherited the title of Prince of Chu. Jiao's grandson, Liu Wu was one of the rebel prince in the Rebellion of the Seven States.

Family
Parents
Liu Taigong
Lady Li, Retired Empress
Siblings
Liu Bang, Emperor Gaozu of Han
Empress Zhao'ai
Descendant
Liu Yu, Emperor Wu of Liu Song

References

178 BC deaths
Han dynasty imperial princes
Year of birth unknown
Politicians from Xuzhou
Han dynasty politicians from Jiangsu
Han dynasty generals from Jiangsu
Emperor Gaozu of Han
Han dynasty essayists
Writers from Xuzhou